Ambaji (Ambājī) is a census town in Banaskantha district  in the state of Gujarat, India. It is known for its historical  connections with sites of cultural heritage.

Geography

Ambaji is a town within taluka  district Banaskantha, North Gujarat, India. It is surrounded by the Araveli Hill range. Ambaji is within the Aravali Range'line of peaks', is a range of mountains in western India running approximately 800 km in a northeastern direction across Indian states of Gujarat, Rajasthan, Haryana and Delhi. It is also called Mewat hills locally. Ambaji town also in between the borders of North Gujarat and Abu Road of Rajasthan.

Demographics
 India census, Ambaji had a population of 17,753. Males constitute 9,132 of the population and females 8,621. Ambaji has an average literacy rate of 78.39%, higher than the state average of 78.03%, with 85.76% of the males and 70.78% of females literate; 14.12% of the population is under 6 years of age.

Climate
Ambaji enjoys all types of weather. In summer, it is hot and humid and the temperature remains between 26 and 46 degrees Celsius with hot winds. In winter, the temperature ranges between 6 and 36 degrees Celsius. During this period, which is quite cool, average rainfall is about 15 to 30 inches; in the monsoon season, per season, average rainfall is about the same as in winter, sometimes with heavy rainfall. Amabaji is at an altitude of 480 m; therefore, weather remains relatively pleasant throughout the year.

About the Temple

Ambaji is an important temple town with millions of devotees visiting the Ambaji temple every year. It is one of the 51 Shakti Peethas. Ambaji Mata Temple is a major Shakti Peeth of India. It is situated at a distance of approximately 65 kilometres from Palanpur, 45 kilometres from Mount Abu, and 20 kilometres from Abu Road, and 185 kilometres from Ahmedabad, 50 kilometers from Kadiyadra near the Gujarat and Rajasthan border.

In the holy temple of "Arasuri Ambaji", there is no image or statue of goddess the holy "Shree Visa Yantra" is worshiped as the main deity. No one can see the Yantra with naked eye. The photography of the Yantra is prohibited.
The Arasuri Ambe Mata or Arbuda Mataji is kuldevi of Barad Parmaras. The one Parmar state is located near the ambaji town I.e.Danta and which also serves as capital of whole parmar clan.

The original seat of Ambaji Mata is on Gabbar hilltop in the town. A large number of devotees visit the temple every year especially on Purnima days. A large mela on Bhadarvi poornima (full moon day) is held. Every Year from all over the country people come here walking all over from their native place just to worship MAA AMBE in September. The whole Ambaji town is lit up as the nation celebrates the festive time of Diwali.

The Ambaji Mata Temple as a Shakti Peeth
 

The shrine of Shri Amba is regarded as a revered shrine by the Shakta Shaktism sect of Hinduism. It is believed that the Heart of Sati Devi has fallen here. The origin of the Shakti Peetha status temple is from the mythology of Daksha yaga and Sati's self immolation. Shakti Peethas were believed to have been formed when the body parts of the corpse of Sati Devi fell into different regions when Lord Shiva carried her corpse in sorrow after her death. The shrines are considered as highly revered by Shaivist (Shaivism) sect in Hinduism. The Shakti Peethas are mostly worshiped by tantra practitioners.

Places near Ambaji town

Gabbar Hill

The Mountain or Hill of Gabbar has also a small temple fortified from the western side and there are 999 steps to go up to the mountain and reach this holy temple at the top of Gabbar Hill. A Holy Lamp is constantly burning on this hill temple facing exactly in front of Visa Shree Yantra of Nij Mandir of Mata Shri Arasuri Ambica. Sightseeing places include a sunset point, Cave and Swings of Mataji and Trips through a ropeway. As per recent study Ambaji Temple was constructed by the Suriyavans Emperor Arun Sen, the ruler of Vallabhi in 4th Century AD

Just about 4.5☃☃km Gabbar hill is situated on the border of Gujarat and Rajasthan, near the flow of the origin of the Vedic virgin river Sarasvati, on the hills of Arasur in forest, towards south-west side to ancient hills of Arawali, at the altitude of about 480 meters, at about ☃☃ high from sea level, having at ☃☃ area as a whole, and it is, in fact, One of the 51 famous Ancient Shakti Peeths and it is place of where the heart of the dead Devi Sati fell at the top of hill of Gabbar as per the legend narrated in the "Tantra Chudamani".☃☃ The Mountain or Hill of Gabbar has also a small temple fortified from the western side and there are 999 steps to go up to the mountain and reach this holy temple at the top of Gabbar Hill. A Holy Lamp is constantly burning on this hill temple facing exactly in front of Visa Shree Yantra of Nij Mandir of Mata Shri Arasuri Ambica. Sightseeing places include a sunset point, Cave and Swings of Mataji and Trips through a ropeway. As per recent study Ambaji Temple was constructed by the Suriyavans Emperor Arun Sen, the ruler of Vallabhi in 4th Century AD.

Kamakshi Mandir
One kilometre away from Ambaji near Kumbharia Jain Temple on Khedbrahma Highway, there is the Kamakshidevi Temple Complex. All 51 Shakti Pith, the centre of cosmic power, are reconstructed and installed in a single complex so as to give total information to the visitors and devotees of the great Shakti Sampraday about the various incarnations of Adhya Shakti Mata.

Kailash Hill sunset
A picnic cum pilgrimage place one and half kilometres away from Ambaji on Khedbrahma Highway, there is a Shivalaya on the top of Kailash tekari, where one can go only by climbing the steps and walking on a hilly area of Kailash Tekari. Moreover, The Temple Trust has recently constructed a big artistic stone gate at the Temple of Mahadev on Kailash Tekari, which is also administered by Shri Arasuri Ambaji Mata Devasthan Trust.

Koteshwar

Just 8 km away from Ambaji near the Origin of the Vedic Virgin River Saraswati, there is an ancient temple of Shri Koteshwar Mahadev, attached with a Holy Kund and the flows of river Saraswati from the Mouth of Cow Gaumukh, incurved in a rock.
As per a legend there was an Ashram of Rushi Valmiki, the author of Ramayana, near Valmiki Mahadev temple and the King of Mevad, Maha Rana Pratap had renovated this holy temple, It is said that during the Mutiny of Independence in 1857, Nana Saheb Peshwa had taken his abode in the cave of this temple.

Kumbhariya

One and a half kilometers away from Ambaji Temple Town. The nearest railway station is the Abu Road about 24 Kilometer and the nearest bus stand 1.5 Kilometer of the Ambaji. It has historical Jain temple of Shri Neminatha Bhagwan which dates back to 13th century. The Kumbhariya Jain temple of Shri Neminatha Bhagwan is now heritage center in Gujarat. The village Kumbhariya also houses educational institute Shree Ambaji Arts College managed by Shree Arasuri Ambaji Mata Devasthan Trust, Ambaji established in 1991

Mansarovar
Man Sarovar is behind the main temple. It is said to have been constructed by Shri Tapishanker, a Nager Devotee of Ambaji from Ahmedabad, from 1584 to 1594. There are two temples on two sides of this holy tank, one is of Mahadev and another is Ajay Devi, who is believed to be the sister of Mata Ambaji. The visitors and devotees use to take holy bath in this Man Sarovar. It is also an important source of history of Ambaji that there is an ancient Monument of Scripts Writings and Old Carvings on Rock Stone "Shilalekh" of Raja Maldev. dated Hindu Calendar Samvat year 1415, in Ajay Devi Mandir. The Temple Trust has also undertaken the renovation projects in respect of Holy Man Sarovar, and its temples and surroundings, behind the main Temple.

Transportation
There is a bus-station of Gujarat State Road Transport Corporation (GSRTC) connecting to all major cities of India, and a railway station is at Palanpur of Banaskantha district, North Gujarat, India.

Road
Ambaji can be reached through Himatnagar road which is connected with National Highway 48 (Mumbai to Delhi). The other road which Passes through Palanpur and Danta and connects with State Highway SH 56 to reach Ambaji.

Rail
The nearest Railway station is at Abu Road which comes under the administrative control of North Western Railway zone of the Indian Railways. It has direct rail links on the broad gauge to the cities of Ajmer Chennai, Thiruvananthapuram, Mysore, Bangalore, Pune, Mumbai, Jaipur, Jodhpur, Delhi, Dehradun, Muzaffarpur, Bareilly and Jammu. It is connected to most of the cities and towns in Gujarat such as Ahmedabad, Surat, Vadodara, Bhuj, Rajkot, Jamnagar and Porbandar. Indian Railways’ proposal to double the broad-gauge line between Palanpur and Samakhiali has received government backing. The doubling will benefit the districts of Kutch, Patan and Banaskantha in the state of Gujarat.

Air
The nearest airport is the Deesa Airport (also spelled Disa Airport), an airport in Deesa, Gujarat but this airport is not working nowadays, originally built for Palanpur, it is just 82 km from Palanpur city.
The nearest international airport is Sardar Vallabhbhai Patel International Airport, Ahmedabad which is 179 km far from Ambaji Temple Town.

Distance from places
From Surat it is 443  km away
From Udaipur it is 157 km away
From Ahmedabad it is 184 km away
From Palanpur it is 65 km away
From Abu Road it is 23 km away
From Jodhpur it is 262 km away

Surrounding cities
Northwest = Deesa
North     = Abu Road, Mount Abu
Northeast = Udaipur
West      = Palanpur
Center    = Ambaji
South     = Himatnagar, Ahmedabad
Southwest = Patan
Southeast = Danta
East      = Idar

References

Hindu temples in Gujarat
Shakti temples
Cities and towns in Banaskantha district
Tourist attractions in Banaskantha district